Neusörnewitz station is a railway station named after the nearby village of Neusörnewitz, part of Coswig, Saxony, Germany. Platform 1 is located in Coswig (Gemarkung Neusörnewitz), platform 2 in Weinböhla, though.

The station lies on the Borsdorf–Coswig railway, passenger services are operated by DB Regio Südost and are part of Dresden S-Bahn network.

References

External links
 

Railway stations in Saxony
Railway stations in Germany opened in 1860
Neusörnewitz
Coswig, Saxony
Weinböhla